Chills is the first solo album by American guitarist Clint Lowery (under the name Hello Demons...Meet Skeletons), released on October 12, 2008. Lowery previously worked with bands like Still Rain, Sevendust and Dark New Day.

Writing and production 

In September 2008, Lowery wrote and recorded a six-song EP while off the road with Sevendust for a week. He played every instrument on the cd, which was produced by his brother Corey Lowery. The album was released under name of Hello Demons...Meet Skeletons. Other Songs that did not make it on the EP were "Bitter" & "Kicking Tree". Also he has posted a cover of the U2 track "Pride" on his official MySpace page.

Clint Lowery streamed some video footage of his first performance for the song "Devil in a Cage".

In May 2009, a new track from Clint Lowery, titled "The Drive", was added to MySpace.
In April and May 2010, "Bitter", "Kicking Tree", and "The Drive" were added to iTunes as individual singles.

Track listing

Personals 
Hello Demons...Meet Skeletons
 Clint Lowery – vocals, guitars, bass, drums, songwriting

Additional personnel
 Corey Lowery – producer, engineer, mixing
 B.C. Kochmit for BCKmedia Inc – art work, design
 Larry Anthony at COS Mastering – mastering
 Jeremy Adamo – photographer

References 

2008 EPs
Clint Lowery albums
Hard rock EPs